Günther Emanuel Graf von Kirchbach (9 August 1850 – 6 November 1925) was a German Generaloberst who served during the First World War.

Biography 
Günther von Kirchbach was born in Erfurt in 1850, the son of Hugo von Kirchbach. He entered the Prussian army in April 1868 as a second lieutenant in the Garde-Füsilier-Regiment and served with this regiment in the Franco-Prussian War of 1870. He married Adda Freiin von Liliencron in 1883. By 1899 Kirchbach had been promoted to Generalmajor. In 1903 he was promoted to Generalleutnant and in 1907 to General der Infanterie. From 1908 to 1911 he was commanding officer of V Corps, a command his father had previously held during the Franco-Prussian War. Kirchbach's last position before the First World War broke out was as President of the Military Tribunal.

On the outbreak of the war in August 1914, Kirchbach was given command of X Reserve Corps which served as part of the 2nd Army on the Western front. On 29 August 1914 Kirchbach was wounded on active service and hospitalized. Relieved of his command due to his injuries, he resumed his former post as head of the Military Tribunal. In September 1916 Kirchbach was given command of the Landwehr Corps. He was given command of Army group Woyrsch in November 1916. In April 1917 Kirchbach was given command of Armee-Abteilung D. In December 1917 he was given command of the 8th Army fighting in the Baltic states. In August 1918 he succeeded Generalfeldmarschall Hermann von Eichhorn as commander of Heeresgruppe Kiew. Kirchbach held this position until 5 February 1919, when he was retired by the new government.

Glossary
Armee-Abteilung or Army Detachment in the sense of "something detached from an Army".  It is not under the command of an Army so is in itself a small Army.
Armee-Gruppe or Army Group in the sense of a group within an Army and under its command, generally formed as a temporary measure for a specific task.
Heeresgruppe or Army Group in the sense of a number of armies under a single commander.

Orders and decorations 
 : Knight of Honour of the Johanniter Order, 1893; Knight of Justice, 1898

Notes

References

Bibliography 
 

German military personnel of the Franco-Prussian War
German Army generals of World War I
Colonel generals of Prussia
1850 births
1925 deaths
Counts of Germany
Military personnel from Erfurt
People from the Province of Saxony
19th-century Prussian military personnel
Recipients of the Iron Cross (1870), 2nd class
Recipients of the Pour le Mérite (military class)
Grand Crosses of the Military Merit Order (Bavaria)